Chamaecelyphus is a genus of Celyphidae.

Species
C. africanus (Walker, 1849)
C. dichrous (Bezzi, 1908)
C. halticinus Frey, 1941
C. kalongensis Vanschuytbroeck, 1963
C. ruwenzoriensis Vanschuytbroeck, 1963
C. straeleni Vanschuytbroeck, 1959
C. upembaensis Vanschuytbroeck, 1952
C. violaceus Vanschuytbroeck, 1959
C. vrydaghi Vanschuytbroeck, 1959

References

Celyphidae
Diptera of Africa
Lauxanioidea genera